Time Doesn't Heal is the sixth Mandarin studio album by Taiwan-born Malaysian Mandopop artist Freya Lim. It was released on 2 May 2014 by Rock Records.

Track listing

 Notes
 "歲月這把刀 (Time Doesn't Heal)" is the closing theme song of the television series Fabulous 30 (女人30情定水舞間).
 "我們的故事只講了一半 (Unfinished Story)" is featured in the television series Just You.
 "明明愛你 (Hidden Love)" is the closing theme song of the television series In a Good Way.

Music videos

References

External links
  Rock Records Taiwan - 歲月這把刀

2014 albums
Freya Lim albums
Rock Records albums
Mandopop albums